Sar Asiab (also Romanized as Sar Āsīāb and Sarāsīāb) is a village in Cheshmeh Kabud Rural District, in the Central District of Harsin County, Kermanshah Province, Iran. At the 2006 census, its population was 28, in 4 families.

References 

Populated places in Harsin County